Lianchi District is a district of Baoding, Hebei, People's Republic of China. Lianchi is formed after the merger of Beishi District and Nanshi District in May 2015.

Administrative divisions
Subdistricts:
Hepingli Subdistrict, Wusi Road Subdistrict, Xiguan Subdistrict, Zhonghua Road Subdistrict, Dongguan Subdistrict, Lianmeng Subdistrict, Hongxing Subdistrict, Yuhua Subdistrict, Yonghua Subdistrict, Nanguan Subdistrict

Townships:
Hanzhuang Township, Dongjinzhuang Township, Bailou Township, Nandayuan Township, Jiaozhuang Township, Yangzhuang Township, Wuyao Township

References

County-level divisions of Hebei
Geography of Baoding